The Diocese of Oran may refer to:

Roman Catholic Diocese of Oran, Algeria
Roman Catholic Diocese of Orán, Argentina